This is a list of large aircraft, including three types: fixed wing, rotary wing, and airships.

The US Federal Aviation Administration defines a large aircraft as any aircraft with a certificated maximum takeoff weight of more than  



Fixed-wing

Projects

Rotary-wing

Proposals

 Yakovlev Yak-60 - Mil V-12 size helicopter design
 Yakovlev VVP-6 - Mil V-12 size helicopter design

Lighter than air

Proposals

Hydrogen carrier airship (2.45 km long) and balloon (727 m wide), 28000 tonne MTOW both.

See also 
 List of largest machines
 List of largest passenger vehicles
 Wide-body aircraft

References

Further reading

External links
Top 50 Largest Aircraft at Global Aircraft
Largest Plane in the World at Aerospaceweb

Large